Phyllonorycter pygmaea is a moth of the family Gracillariidae. It is known from Japan (the islands of Hokkaidō, Kyūshū, Shikoku and Honshū), Korea and the Russian Far East.

The wingspan is 5-5.5 mm.

The larvae feed on Castanea crenata, Quercus acutissima, Quercus crispula, Quercus mongolica and Quercus serrata. They mine the leaves of their host plant. The mine has the form of a ptychonomous blotch mine on the underside of the leaf.

References

pygmaea
Moths of Asia
Moths described in 1963